The 2011–12 Danish 2nd Divisions, beginning on 6 August 2011 and ending on 16 June 2012, will be the divided in two groups of sixteen teams. The two group winners will face each other for a single promotion spot in a two-legged play-off, rather than the normal three promotion spots, as decided in March 2010. This is done to reduce the First Division from 14 to 12 teams.

Because of an uneven distribution of West and East-teams (divided by the Great Belt), two East-teams, Lolland-Falster Alliancen and BK Skjold, were drawn into the West-division.

Participants

East

League table

West

League table

Play-offs

Promotion game
The two winners will play promotion game on home and away basis.

Game details
First leg

Second leg

References

3
Danish 2nd Divisions
Danish 2nd Division seasons

da:2. division (fodbold)